"I Think I'm Okay" (stylized as "I Think I'm OKAY") is a song by American musician Machine Gun Kelly, English musician Yungblud, and fellow American musician Travis Barker. It was released as a single on June 7, 2019, from Machine Gun Kelly's fourth studio album Hotel Diablo.

Background and release 
The song was leaked in May 2019. Kelly stated in an interview with Zane Lowe that he was worried about including Barker on the song, in fear that the song might sound more like Barker's music style. According to Kelly, Yungblud freestyled and recorded his verse in 10 minutes.

In the song, Kelly and Yungblud sing about the usage of substances and personal demons, while Barker handles the percussion. On the hook, Kelly criticizes his own reckless lifestyle and dangerous habits.

Music video 
The music video was released June 14, 2019. Noah Cyrus and FaZe Clan co-owner FaZe Banks made cameos in the video. The video was directed by Andrew Sandler.
In under 24 hours, the music video surpassed one million views.

Charts

Weekly charts

Year-end charts

Certifications

References 

2019 singles
2019 songs
Machine Gun Kelly (musician) songs
Yungblud songs
Travis Barker songs
Songs written by Machine Gun Kelly (musician)
Songs written by Travis Barker
Songs written by Yungblud
Hard rock songs